Marin Bluff is a small rock bluff rising to ,  east-southeast of Cape Jeremy on the west side of the Antarctic Peninsula.  The feature is one of several in the area named after winds.  Named by the UK Antarctic Place-names Committee in 1977 after the marin, a warm south or southeast wind of the Gulf of Lion in France.

References

Palmer Land